Elisabeth Garcia (born 3 January 1975) is a Norwegian sport wrestler.

She won a bronze medal at the 1991 World Wrestling Championships in Tokyo.

She represented the club Lørenskog BK.

References

1975 births
Living people
Norwegian female sport wrestlers
World Wrestling Championships medalists
20th-century Norwegian women
21st-century Norwegian women